Lajeado may refer to:

Places in Brazil
Lajeado, Tocantins
Lajeado, Rio Grande do Sul
Lajeado (district of São Paulo)
Lajeado Grande
Lajeado Novo
Lajeado do Bugre

Rivers in Brazil
Lajeado Agudo
Lajeado Grande River (disambiguation)
Lajeado Macuco River
Lajeado River (disambiguation)